, known by the stage name , was a Japanese actor and voice actor. He was the official Japanese dub-over artist of actors Telly Savalas (with whom he met several times), Jean Gabin, Spencer Tracy, and Lino Ventura.

Overview 
On 23 July 1999, he was paralysed in his right half by a cerebral infarction, but his body did not fully recover due to the lack of early treatment. Numbness in his limbs was also not easy to improve, with transient cerebral ischemic attacks causing his body to move involuntarily, and from the time of hospitalization until his death he needed continuous rehabilitation.

He died of pneumonia at 9:10 p.m. on February 8, 2021, aged of 86, at a hospital in Saitama Prefecture.

Filmography

Television dramas
 Furuhata Ninzaburō (episode 10) (Uno)
 Ōedo Sōsamō
 The Samurai

Movies
 Shall We Dance? (1996) (Ryo Kishikawa)
 Salaryman Kintarō (1999) (Genzo Oshima)
 Tsuribaka Nisshi Eleven (2000) (Horita)

Television animation
 Tiger Mask (1969)
 Captain (1980) (Aoba Baseball Manager)
 Digimon Tamers (2001) (Zhuqiaomon)
 Jormungand (2012) (Narration)

Theatrical animation
 Nutcracker Fantasy (1979) (Poet)
 Phoenix 2772 (1980) (Volcan)
 Arcadia of My Youth (1982) (Old Tokargan Soldier)
 Dragon Ball: Curse of the Blood Rubies (1986) (King Gourmeth)
 Porco Rosso (1992) (Porco Rosso)
 Doraemon: Nobita and Tin-Plate Labyrinth (1993) (Napogistora)
 Ninja Scroll (1993) (Hyobu Sakaki)
 Doraemon: Nobita and the Robot Kingdom (2002) (Dester)

Video games
 Kingdom Hearts (2002) (Flotsam and Jetsam)
 The Last Remnant (2008) (Wagram)
 Final Fantasy Type-0 (2011) (Cid Aulstyne)
 Final Fantasy Type-0 HD (2015) (Cid Aulstyne)
 Inazuma Eleven (2008) (Hibiki Seigou)

Dubbing roles

Live-action
Telly Savalas
 The Assassination Bureau (Lord Bostwick)
 On Her Majesty's Secret Service (Ernst Stavro Blofeld)
 Violent City (1985 TBS edition) (Al Weber)
 Pretty Maids All in a Row (Police Captain Sam Surcher)
 Sonny & Jed (1979 TV Tokyo edition) (Sheriff Franciscus)
 Kojak (Lieutenant Theodore "Theo" Kojak)
 Inside Out (Harry Morgan)
 Beyond the Poseidon Adventure (1989 TBS edition) (Captain Stefan Svevo)
 Escape to Athena (1982 TBS edition) (Zeno)
 Cannonball Run II (1988 TV Asahi edition) (Hymie Kaplan)
Spencer Tracy
 Boys Town (Father Flanagan)
 Boom Town ("Square John" Sand)
 Northwest Passage (Major Rogers)
 The Sea of Grass (Col. Jim Brewton)
 Father of the Bride (Stanley T. Banks)
 Father's Little Dividend (Stanley T. Banks)
 Broken Lance (1969 TV Asahi edition) (Matt Devereaux)
 Desk Set (Richard Sumner)
 Judgment at Nuremberg (Chief Judge Dan Haywood)
Jean Gabin
 La belle équipe (Jean dit Jeannot )
 Pépé le Moko (1976 Nippon Television edition) (Pépé le Moko)
 Touchez pas au grisbi (Max dit Max le Menteur)
 Voici le temps des assassins (André Chatelin )
 In Case of Adversity (Maitre André Gobillot)
 Any Number Can Win (1970, 1972 TV Tokyo and 1975 TV Asahi editions) (Mister Charles)
 Le clan des siciliens (Vittorio Manalese)
 Deux hommes dans la ville (Germain Cazeneuve)
Charles Bronson
 Rider on the Rain (1977 TBS edition) (Dobbs)
 The Mechanic (1977 TBS edition) (Arthur Bishop)
 Red Sun (1975 TBS edition) (Link Stuart)
 Breakheart Pass (1980 TBS edition) (Deakin)
 From Noon till Three (1981 TBS edition) (Graham)
 Love and Bullets (1981 TBS edition) (Charlie Congers)
 The Big Brawl (Dominici (José Ferrer))
 Fist of Fury (Hiroshi Suzuki (Chikara Hashimoto))
 Frankenstein Created Woman (1970 TV Asahi edition) (Baron Victor Frankenstein (Peter Cushing))
 The Getaway (1978 Fuji TV edition) (Jack Beynon (Ben Johnson))
 The Great Silence (1972 TV Asahi edition) (Henry Pollicut (Luigi Pistilli))
 Last Action Hero (1996 Fuji TV edition) (Tony Vivaldi (Anthony Quinn))
 The Magnificent Seven (1974 TV Asahi edition) (Harry Luck (Brad Dexter))
 The Man from Hong Kong (Inspector Bob Taylor (Roger Ward))
 Prison Break (Jonathan Krantz (Leon Russom))
 The Professionals (George Cowley (Gordon Jackson))
 The Reptile (Tom Bailey (Michael Ripper))
 Rollercoaster (1981 Nippon Television edition) (Agent Hoyt (Richard Widmark))
 Tony Arzenta (1976 TV Asahi edition) (Nick Gusto (Richard Conte))

Animation
 The Little Mermaid (Flotsam and Jetsam)
 Rango (Buford)
 The Rescuers Down Under (Percival C. McLeach)

References

External links
 ALL OUT profile
 

1934 births
2021 deaths
Japanese male video game actors
Japanese male voice actors
Male voice actors from Nagoya